The South Dakota School for the Blind and Visually Impaired (SDSBVI) is a state-supported school located in Aberdeen, South Dakota, which provides services to meet the educational needs of children who are blind, visually impaired, or deaf-blind from birth through the age of 21. SDSBVI has been governed by the South Dakota Board of Regents since 1945.

Founded in 1900 in Gary, South Dakota, SDSBVI began as a charitable asylum. In 1917, the state legislature designated it for the "care, maintenance, and instruction of blind babies and children under school age". In 1925, the institution became the South Dakota School for the Blind, expanding the upper age limit to 21 years of age and providing students with up to 12 years of schooling at the state's expense.

On September 18, 1961, the school moved to its present location in Aberdeen, and in 1970 the name was changed to the South Dakota School for the Visually Handicapped to better address the range of students it served. In 1994, the school was accredited by the North Central Association of Colleges and Schools, and in 1998, the school adopted its current name as the South Dakota School for the Blind and Visually Impaired.

Campus
The school has dormitory facilities.

References

External links
Official website

Buildings and structures in Aberdeen, South Dakota
Schools for the blind in the United States
Public high schools in South Dakota
Schools in Brown County, South Dakota
Education in Brown County, South Dakota
Public middle schools in South Dakota
Educational institutions established in 1900
1900 establishments in South Dakota
Public K-12 schools in the United States
Public boarding schools in the United States
Boarding schools in South Dakota